Andřej Studenič (born 18 June 1977 in Bratislava) is a racing driver. Studenič started his hillclimb career in 1993, competing at a professional level until 1998 when he made the move to full-time circuit racing. He joined the Central European Touring Car Championship in 1997 with the Audi team, moving to Super Tourenwagen Cup in 1999.

After a quiet 2000, he returned to drive part of the German V8Star Series season in 2001, competing sparsely in 2002 with one FIA GT Championship Class B race for Machanek Porsche. He joined the Porsche Supercup for 2003 and 2004, and in 2005, he competed in Class B of the GT Championship again, with Rudolf Machánek.

External links
 

Slovak racing drivers
1977 births
FIA GT Championship drivers
Living people
Porsche Supercup drivers
European Touring Car Championship drivers
World Touring Car Cup drivers
Sportspeople from Bratislava

24H Series drivers